The 1976 Gillette Cup was the fourteenth Gillette Cup, an English limited overs county cricket tournament. It was held between 26 June and 4 September 1976. The tournament was won by Northamptonshire County Cricket Club who defeated Lancashire County Cricket Club by 4 wickets in the final at Lord's.

Format
The seventeen first-class counties, were joined by five Minor Counties: Berkshire, Hertfordshire, Lincolnshire, Shropshire and Staffordshire. Teams who won in the first round progressed to the second round. The winners in the second round then progressed to the quarter-final stage. Winners from the quarter-finals then progressed to the semi-finals from which the winners then went on to the final at Lord's which was held on 4 September 1976.

First round

Second round

Quarter-finals

Semi-finals

Final

References

External links
CricketArchive tournament page 

Friends Provident Trophy seasons
Gillette Cup, 1976